Karen Hitchcock may refer to:

 Karen R. Hitchcock (1943–2019), American biologist and university administrator
 Karen Hitchcock (author), Australian author and medical doctor